This Time Next Year is a British reality television show that aired on ITV from 2 November 2016 to 12 March 2019. It was presented by Davina McCall.

On 20 February 2017, it was announced that the show had been recommissioned for a second and third series.

Premise
The series sees participants make a pledge to attain a personal life goal (such as losing weight or starting a new career) that they will then attempt to achieve over the next year. The participant then appears to leave the set and then return moments later with one year having passed, the transition made seamless through editing. They are then interviewed about what they have achieved and the challenges they faced during the past year.

Transmissions

References

External links

2016 British television series debuts
2019 British television series endings
2010s British reality television series
English-language television shows
ITV reality television shows
Television series by ITV Studios
Television shows shot at Elstree Film Studios